Carolyn Jeanne Bessette-Kennedy (January 7, 1966July 16, 1999) was a publicist for Calvin Klein. After her marriage to John F. Kennedy Jr., Bessette-Kennedy's relationship with her husband and her fashion sense became the subjects of media scrutiny, drawing comparisons to her mother-in-law Jacqueline Kennedy Onassis. The couple and Bessette-Kennedy's older sister, Lauren, died in a plane crash off the coast of Martha's Vineyard on July 16, 1999.

Early life and education
Bessette was born in White Plains, New York, in 1966. She was the youngest child of William J. Bessette, an engineer, and Ann Messina, an administrator in the New York City public school system. She had two older sisters, twins Lauren and Lisa. She was Italian American on her mother's side. 

Bessette's parents divorced when she was very young. Her mother later remarried to Richard Freeman, an orthopedic surgeon, and moved to Old Greenwich, Connecticut, while Bessette's father stayed in White Plains.

Bessette attended Juniper Hill Elementary School. At Juniper Hill, Bessette's mother was a substitute teacher.

Raised in a Roman Catholic household, Bessette later attended St. Mary's High School. At St. Mary's, Bessette was voted by her classmates the "Ultimate Beautiful Person". During her high school experience, Bessette was described as being part of the "in crowd" and having attended "all the right parties". She had initially started high school at Greenwich High School, but her parents transferred her to St. Mary's because they felt she was not taking her studies seriously.

After graduating from high school in 1984, Bessette attended Boston University's School of Education,  graduating in 1988 with a degree in elementary education. While there, she dated John Cullen, star of the school's ice hockey team, who would later play professional hockey in the NHL.

Bessette briefly attempted a modeling career, and hired a professional photographer to take pictures for her portfolio. Although her modeling career did not prove to be profitable, she did appear on the cover of Boston University's calendar, "The Girls of B.U."

Career
After college and until her marriage to Kennedy, Bessette worked for the American fashion label 
Calvin Klein. During her career there, she went from being a saleswoman at the Chestnut Hill Mall in Newton, Massachusetts to becoming the director of publicity for the company's flagship store in Manhattan. While working for Klein in Boston, Bessette was noticed by Susan Sokol, a travelling sales coordinator for the company. Sokol, impressed with Bessette's grace and style, later recommended her for a position dealing with Klein's high-profile clients, such as actress Annette Bening and newscaster Diane Sawyer. By the time she left Calvin Klein, she was the director of show productions, earning a salary in the low six figures.

Bessette first met Kennedy in 1992, while he was dating actress Daryl Hannah.  Bessette and Kennedy began dating in 1994 and became a popular paparazzi target, and gossip columns detailed where they ate and shopped, and even covered their public disagreements. Paparazzi often waited outside the couple's Tribeca apartment to snap photographs.

Bessette was introduced to  John's uncle,  Senator Ted Kennedy, in the late summer of 1994. Following the marriage, the senator would tell the press: "You could tell right away that there was something special between the two of them." Bessette moved into Kennedy's Tribeca loft in the summer of 1995, and the couple became engaged later that year. She quit her job at Calvin Klein in the spring of 1996.

Wedding

Kennedy and Bessette succeeded in keeping their September 21, 1996, wedding a secret from the press, avoiding media onlookers. The ceremony took place by candlelight on the remote Georgia island of Cumberland, in a tiny wooden chapel, the First African Baptist Church. The bride selected the then-little-known designer Narciso Rodriguez of Cerruti for her wedding dress of pearl-white silk crêpe. The groom's older sister, Caroline Kennedy, was matron of honor, and Anthony Radziwill, the son of his aunt Lee Radziwill-Ross, served as Kennedy's best man. Caroline's two daughters, Tatiana and Rose, were flower girls, and her son Jack was the ring bearer. The couple honeymooned in Turkey.

Married life
After the wedding, the media attention surrounding the couple intensified, and Bessette-Kennedy often found it difficult to deal with the harassment. When the couple returned from their honeymoon, a mass of reporters was waiting on their doorstep.

John said, "Getting married is a big adjustment for us, and for a private citizen like Carolyn even more so. I ask you to give her all the privacy and room you can."

Bessette-Kennedy was badly disoriented by the constant attention from the paparazzi. The couple were permanently on show, both at fashionable Manhattan events and on their travels to visit celebrities such as Mariuccia Mandelli and Gianni Versace.  Bessette-Kennedy told her friend, Carole Radziwill, that the only way to avoid the paparazzi was to leave her apartment at 7 in the morning. She also complained to her friend, journalist Jonathan Soroff, that she could not get a job without being accused of exploiting her fame. Her minimalist "throwaway chic" fashion sense was chronicled by various fashion publications and drew repeated comparisons to her mother-in-law, former First Lady Jacqueline Kennedy Onassis.

While the interest surrounding the couple continued, Bessette-Kennedy refused to give interviews and turned down offers to appear in fashion magazines. Towards the end of her life, Bessette-Kennedy became more involved with charity work and often accompanied her husband to dinners at the White House. The couple were given a White House tour by President Bill Clinton in March 1998, and she acted as the hostess at parties for her husband's political magazine George.

According to some reports published after their deaths, the Kennedys were experiencing marital problems and contemplating divorce in the months preceding their deaths. The couple had various disagreements, including her refusal to start a family, John's work on the George magazine, where she felt forsaken, and her dislike of John's publishing partner Michael Berman. According to Vanity Fair, Bessette-Kennedy's "insecurity fueled a need to control and manipulate; her frequent use of cocaine made her paranoid". Moreover, Bessette-Kennedy was jealous of and barely on speaking terms with her sister-in-law Caroline Kennedy, who reportedly criticized the bride for being late to her own wedding and wearing heels on the beach.

However, close friends reject the divorce claims.  Robert Littell, who spent the weekend with John and Carolyn a week before their deaths, also rejected the allegation that the couple were living apart at the time of their deaths.

In his book, The Kennedy Curse: Why Tragedy Has Haunted America's First Family for 150 Years, author Edward Klein claimed that the couple's problems reportedly stemmed from Bessette-Kennedy's difficulty dealing with the media attention surrounding her and the marriage, accusations of infidelity, disagreements about having children, and Bessette-Kennedy's alleged cocaine use. Although Klein is the author of several Kennedy books, John Kennedy Jr. said, when speaking of Klein, "he is a guy who had lunch with my mother twenty years ago and has been dining out on it ever since." Friends of the couple, including John Perry Barlow and Christiane Amanpour, said that Bessette-Kennedy and Kennedy fought on occasion and that Bessette-Kennedy had trouble adjusting to the intense media coverage, but denied that she used drugs or that the couple was planning to divorce. The couple began seeing a marriage counselor in March 1999 and sought counseling from Cardinal John O'Connor in the summer of 1999.

Plane crash and death 

Bessette-Kennedy died on July 16, 1999, along with her husband and older sister Lauren, when the light plane he was piloting crashed into the Atlantic Ocean off the western coast of Martha's Vineyard. The National Transportation Safety Board (NTSB) determined that the probable cause of the crash was: "The pilot's failure to maintain control of the airplane during a descent over water at night, which was a result of spatial disorientation. Factors in the accident were haze and the dark night."

After a five-day search, the wreckage was discovered in the late afternoon of July 21. The bodies were recovered from the ocean floor by Navy divers and taken by motorcade to the county medical examiner's office, where autopsies revealed that the crash victims had died upon impact. At the same time, the Kennedy and Bessette families announced their plans for memorial services.

Toxicology testing was conducted on the pilot and passengers. All tested negative for alcohol and drugs. In the late hours of July 21, the three bodies were taken from Hyannis to Duxbury, where they were cremated in the Mayflower Cemetery crematorium.

In popular culture
Before marrying Kennedy, Bessette was in a relationship with Calvin Klein model Michael Bergin, who wrote a memoir titled The Other Man: John F. Kennedy Jr., Carolyn Bessette, and Me, which was published in 2004.

In 2004, Kennedy's fellow Brown University alumnus and ex-roommate, Robert T. Littell published, The Men We Became: My Friendship With John F. Kennedy Jr.

In 2005, Bessette-Kennedy's close friend Carole Radziwill, wife of John's cousin Anthony Stanislas Radziwill, published a memoir entitled What Remains: A Memoir of Fate, Friendship and Love, that includes her memories of the plane crash that took place just weeks before her own husband's death from cancer.

In 2012, Kennedy's assistant and publicist, RoseMarie Terenzio, published her experiences and behind-the-scenes observations based on her five years working with Kennedy and, eventually, her friendship with him and his wife in Fairy Tale Interrupted: A Memoir of Life, Love, and Loss.

Rosamund Pike was encouraged by Gone Girl director David Fincher to base her character, Amy Dunne, on Bessette-Kennedy. Fincher said of Bessette-Kennedy, "She crafted herself, she re-invented herself, and invented that persona. That's where I began." Pike searched unsuccessfully for audio of her, though she would concede her character should be created from the "outside in".

In 2015, Wes Gordon, known for disliking discussion about the influences of his collections, admitted Bessette-Kennedy's impact on the clothing for women in that year's collection. Gordon was long interested in Bessette-Kennedy's style prior to production.

On July 13, 2019, footage of their secret wedding was released in JFK Jr. and Carolyn's Wedding: The Lost Tapes, a two-hour special on TLC, along with interviews with family and guests.

See also

 Kennedy Curse

References

Works cited

External links

1966 births
1999 deaths
20th-century American women
Kennedy family
Accidental deaths in Massachusetts
American people of French-Canadian descent
American people of Italian descent
American publicists
American socialites
Boston University School of Education alumni
Burials at sea
Catholics from New York (state)
Catholics from Connecticut
People from Greenwich, Connecticut
People from White Plains, New York
Victims of aviation accidents or incidents in 1999
Victims of aviation accidents or incidents in the United States
Greenwich High School alumni